Laurence Gregory Solov (born May 20, 1968) is an American attorney best known as the co-founder and CEO of Breitbart News.

Early life and education
Solov was born to a Jewish family in Los Angeles, the son of Joanne (née Skolnick), a social worker, and attorney Lessing Solov. His grandfather Charles Solov was born in the Russian Empire and immigrated to the United States in the early 20th century. He has a younger sister, Rachel. He graduated from Stanford University in 1990 with a degree in religious studies, followed by a J.D. degree from UCLA in 1994.

Career
Solov became CEO, main owner, and president of Breitbart News after the death of Andrew Breitbart in 2012. Solov was Breitbart's childhood friend, and served as general counsel for the company from 2007.

References

External links 

Living people
1968 births
American chief executives in the media industry
Breitbart News people
20th-century American Jews
Stanford University alumni
UCLA School of Law alumni
American people of Russian-Jewish descent
Lawyers from Los Angeles
21st-century American Jews